Abietoideae is a subfamily of the conifer family Pinaceae. The name is from the genus Abies (firs), which contains most of the species in the genus. Six genera are currently assigned to this subfamily: Abies, Cedrus, Keteleeria, Nothotsuga, Pseudolarix, and Tsuga.

The group was formerly treated as a separate family, the Abietaceae, by some plant taxonomy systems, such as the Wettstein system.

Genera and species
 Abies - firs
 Abies alba— silver fir
 Abies amabilis—Pacific silver fir
 Abies balsamea—balsam fir
 Abies beshanzuensis—Baishanzu fir
 Abies borisii-regis— Bulgarian fir
 Abies bracteata—bristlecone fir
 Abies cephalonica— Greek fir
 Abies chensiensis—Shensi fir
 Abies cilicica—Syrian fir
 Abies concolor—white fir
 Abies delavayi—Delavay's fir
 Abies densa—Bhutan fir
 Abies durangensis—Durango fir
 Abies fabri—Faber's fir
 Abies fanjingshanensis—Fanjingshan fir
 Abies fargesii— Farges' fir
 Abies firma—Momi fir
 Abies flinckii—Jalisco fir
 Abies forrestii—Forrest's fir
 Abies fraseri—Fraser fir
 Abies grandis— grand fir or giant fir
 Abies guatemalensis—Guatemalan fir
 Abies hickelii—Hickel's fir
 Abies holophylla—Manchurian fir
 Abies homolepis—Nikko fir
 Abies kawakamii—Taiwan fir
 Abies koreana—Korean fir
 Abies lasiocarpa—subalpine fir
 Abies magnifica—red fir
 Abies mariesii—Maries' fir
 Abies milleri—Early Eocene
 Abies nebrodensis— Sicilian fir
 Abies nephrolepis—Khinghan fir
 Abies nordmanniana— Nordmann fir or Caucasian fir
 Abies numidica—Algerian fir
 Abies pindrow—Pindrow fir
 Abies pinsapo—Spanish fir
 Abies procera—noble fir
 Abies recurvata—Min fir
 Abies religiosa—sacred fir
 Abies sachalinensis—Sakhalin fir
 Abies sibirica—Siberian fir
 Abies spectabilis—East Himalayan fir
 Abies squamata—flaky fir
 Abies veitchii—Veitch's fir
 Abies vejarii
 Abies yuanbaoshanensis—Yuanbaoshan fir
 Abies ziyuanensis—Ziyuan fir
 Cedrus
 Cedrus atlantica
 Cedrus brevifolia
 Cedrus deodara
 Cedrus libani
 Keteleeria
 Keteleeria davidiana
 Keteleeria evelyniana
 Keteleeria fortunei
 Nothotsuga
 Nothotsuga longibracteata
 Pseudolarix
 †Pseudolarix arnoldii
 Pseudolarix amabilis
 †Pseudolarix wehrii
 Tsuga - hemlocks
 Tsuga canadensis – eastern hemlock – Eastern Canada, Eastern United States
 Tsuga caroliniana – Carolina hemlock – Southern Appalachians
 Tsuga chinensis – Taiwan hemlock – much of China incl Tibet + Taiwan
 Tsuga diversifolia – northern Japanese hemlock – Honshu, Kyushu
 Tsuga dumosa – Himalayan hemlock – Himalayas, Tibet, Yunnan, Sichuan
 Tsuga forrestii – Forrest's hemlock – Sichuan, Yunnan, Guizhou
 Tsuga heterophylla – western hemlock – Western Canada, Northwestern United States
 Tsuga × jeffreyi  – British Columbia, Washington
 Tsuga mertensiana – mountain hemlock – Alaska, British Columbia, Western United States
 Tsuga sieboldii – southern Japanese hemlock – Japan
 Tsuga ulleungensis – Ulleungdo hemlock – Ulleungdo island, Korea

References

Pinaceae
Plant subfamilies